Three ships of the Royal Navy have borne the name HMS Battleaxe:

  was the former Russian trawler Safir launched in 1916 and taken up for Royal Navy use.  She became the fishery protection trawler Dee in September, 1920.
 HMS Battleaxe was a  launched in 1943 and transferred to the Royal Navy under lend-lease. She was renamed  shortly after being launched, and was returned to the US Navy in 1947, later transferred to Greece as Nafkratoussa.
  was a  launched in 1945 and broken up in 1964.
  was a Type 22 frigate launched in 1977. She was sold to the Brazilian Navy in 1997 and renamed Rademaker

See also
 , an infantry landing ship operated by the Ministry of War Transport.

References

Royal Navy ship names